Dendrobium neospectabile, commonly known as the Eungella king orchid, is a species of epiphytic or lithophytic orchid that is endemic to tropical North Queensland. It has cylindrical, yellowish green pseudobulbs, up to three thick, leathery leaves and up to two hundred and fifty crowded cream-coloured to pale yellow flowers with reddish purple streaks on the labellum.

Description 
The sides lobes are erect and the middle lobe has a more or less square-cut tip. Flowering occurs from August and October.

Taxonomy and naming
The Eungella king orchid was first formally described in 2006 by David Jones and Mark Clements from a plant grown in the Australian National Botanic Gardens from a specimen collected in the Eungella National Park. It was given the name Thelychiton spectabilis and the description was published in Australian Orchid Research. In 2014, Julian Shaw changed the name to Dendrobium neospectabile because the name Dendrobium spectabile was already given to a different orchid. The specific epithet (spectabilis) given by Jones and Brown is a Latin word meaning "notable" or "showy", referring to the floral display of this orchid. The prefix neo- means "new", "young" or "recent".

Distribution and habitat
Dendrobium neospectabile grows on tall rainforest trees, in sheltered places in open forest and sometimes on cliffs and boulders. It occurs in mountainous areas in and around Eungella National Park.

References

neospectabile
Endemic orchids of Australia
Orchids of Queensland
Plants described in 2006